, commonly known as Masjid Asakusa or , is a mosque located in Asakusa, downtown Tokyo, that was built in 1998. It is managed by the Japan Mosque Foundation (JMF) which is one of the departments in the institute Islamic Circle of Japan.

Services  
The center currently provides the following basic services: 
 Five-time congregational daily prayers and weekly Friday prayer.
 Islamic marriage ceremonies (including certificates)
 Islamic library 
 Shahadah (including issuing certificates)
 Funeral services
 Classes about various Islamic topics at the center 
 Dissemination of Islamic information.

Location 
Dar Al-Arqam Mosque is situated at a walk-able distance (less than 2 km away) from Tokyo Skytree. So, the tourists could check-in the mosque for salat (prayers), whenever around Tokyo Skytree. Also, this mosque is only 500 m away from Sumida Park, from where you can get a beautiful view of Tokyo Skytree and can also view cherry blossom (sakura) during the spring.

This mosque, located in Central Tokyo that can be reached within less than 15 minutes walking distance through Minami Senju Metro station from line Hibiya line, JR East: Jōban Line and Tsukuba Line or through Asakusa Metro Station from Ginza line, Toei Asakusa Line and Tobu Skytree Line.

Bus travelers can come to mosque through Imado bus station (1 min walk) or Higashi Asakusa bus station (1 min walk).

References

External links 

  Official Site
 Information about Asakusa Mosque
 Map of the mosque

1998 establishments in Japan
Darul Arqam, Mosque
Asakusa
Mosques completed in 1998